Rutgers Biomedical and Health Sciences (RBHS) is the umbrella organization for the schools and assets acquired by Rutgers University after the July 1, 2013 breakup of the former University of Medicine and Dentistry of New Jersey. While its various facilities are spread across several locations statewide, Rutgers Biomedical and Health Sciences is considered the university's fourth campus.

This division of the university comprises the following schools, centers, institutes, and programs:
 Cancer Institute of New Jersey
 Center for Advanced Biotechnology and Medicine
 Environmental and Occupational Health Sciences Institute
 Ernest Mario School of Pharmacy
 Graduate School of Biomedical Sciences
 Institute for Health, Health Care Policy and Aging Research
 Medical Schools
 New Jersey Medical School
 Robert Wood Johnson Medical School
 School of Nursing
 School of Dental Medicine
 School of Health Professions
 School of Public Health
 University Behavioral HealthCare

History
RBHS was created in response to the 2012 New Jersey Medical and Health Sciences Education Restructuring Act that asked that UMDNJ be merged into Rutgers University. Not all UMDNJ units became part of RBHS. Thus the School of Osteopathic Medicine at Stratford became part of Rowan University, and the University Hospital in Newark became a freestanding state-owned institution.

Rutgers Health 
In 2016, Rutgers University’s Board of Governors approved the establishment of Rutgers Health as a new health care provider organization that would be the clinical arm of Rutgers University.  Rutgers Health coordinates with Rutgers Health Group, a subsidiary nonprofit corporation that functioning as an integrated, interprofessional faculty practice plan with more than 1,000 Rutgers-based physicians, dentists, psychologists, nurses, pharmacists and other clinicians and Rutgers Health Network, a grouping of teaching hospitals, community centers, medical groups, wellness centers and other affiliated entities and partners providing care through their relationship with Rutgers.

References

External links
 Rutgers, The State University of New Jersey
 Rutgers Biomedical and Health Sciences

Rutgers University
Healthcare in New Jersey
2013 establishments in New Jersey